FarSite Communications Limited is a privately owned designer, developer and manufacturer of communications and smart city products. FarSite was founded in 1998 and has headquarters in Basingstoke, United Kingdom.  FarSite was founded by a team of people formerly working for Racal Datacom Limited and The Software Forge Limited.

FarSite products are sold worldwide both direct and through a number of local distributors and resellers.  FarSite also provide development services to other companies needing communications or systems level development expertise.

Products
FarSite Communications' products include the following:

 FarSync PCI, PCIe and PCMCIA cards
 FarSync Flex USB communications device
 FarLinX Gateway appliances
 Communications software products
netBin Container Fill Level Monitoring System
nLok Container Access Control Solution 
Liquinet Liquid Level Monitoring Solution

Various communications protocols are supported by the PC-based communications cards on both Linux and Windows operating systems, including

 X.25
 PPP - Point-to-Point Protocol
 Cisco HDLC
 Frame Relay
 HDLC
 Bitstreaming for Digital Audio Broadcasting and VOIP

The Communications Gateways provide TCP to X.25 and X.25 to XOT interworking.

Awards

In 2009, FarSite Communications Limited was awarded the Queen's Award for Enterprise, the United Kingdom's most prestigious award for business performance.

References

External links
FarSite Communications Limited
FarSite IoT website

Technology companies established in 1998
Telecommunications equipment vendors
Networking hardware companies
Privately held companies of the United Kingdom
1998 establishments in England
British companies established in 1998